A concentric reducer is used to join pipe sections or tube sections on the same axis. The concentric reducer is cone-shaped, and is used when there is a shift in diameter between pipes. For example, when a 1" pipe transitions into a 3/4" pipe and the top or bottom of the pipe doesn't need to remain level. This pipe reducer may be used when there is a single diameter change or multiple diameter changes.
Unlike eccentric reducers, concentric reducers have a common center line. Concentric reducers are useful when cavitation is present.
 Eccentricity occurs when the centerline is offset.

See also 
 Piping and plumbing fitting
 Reducer

References

Piping
Pumps
Plumbing